The following article presents a summary of the 1925 football (soccer) season in Brazil, which was the 24th season of competitive football in the country.

Campeonato Paulista

Final Standings

AA das Palmeiras matches were canceled, as the club abandoned the competition.

AA São Bento declared as the Campeonato Paulista champions.

State championship champions

Other competition champions

Brazil national team
The following table lists all the games played by the Brazil national football team in official competitions and friendly matches during 1925.

References

 Brazilian competitions at RSSSF
 1925 Brazil national team matches at RSSSF

 
Seasons in Brazilian football
Brazil